This is the production discography of Craig "KLC" Lawson, an American hip hop music producer from New Orleans, Louisiana, and lead producer of the production team The Medicine Men. Lawson is credited (solo and with other team members) on close to 300 studio recordings covering over 100 studio albums. His RIAA accolades include approximately eighteen gold albums, twelve platinum albums, four double-platinum albums, two triple-platinum albums, and one quadruple-platinum album as well as two gold singles, two platinum singles and one double-platinum single. Lawson has two Grammy Award nominations, both at the 45th Annual Grammy Awards for "Best Rap Album" (Word of Mouf by Ludacris and Tarantula by Mystikal) and two BMI Awards - one for the hit single Move Bitch (by Ludacris) and one for the associated album Word of Mouf.

Studio albums
List of albums and single, with peak chart positions, RIAA certifications and other awards
{| class="wikitable sortable" style="text-align:left top;" border="1"
! scope="col" | Year
! scope="col" | Album Title
! scope="col" style="width:10em;"| Artist
! scope="col" | Single Title(s)
! scope="col" | Certification and Billboard Chart Positions
|-

|1988
|Ain't Nuthin Nice (Single)
|MC Jro J
|
| —
|-

|1991
|Clockin b/w Pumped in Power (Single)
|39 Posse
|
| —
|-

|1993
|39 Automatic
|39 Posse
|
 Got What It Takes To Make It (Remix)
 Bitch I'm Dart
 39 Automatic
 Hot Spot
 Stuntin´ Stars
 Ask Them Hoes
 Pass The Snake
 Bonus Beat
| —
|-
|1993
|No Elevation
| E.X.D. (Hounds of Gert Town)
|
 Intro I
 No Elevation
 Blow Of Death
 Play You Bitches Dumb
 Intro II
 Knockin' Niggas Off
 Another Brother Filla Coffin
| —
|-

|1994
|Dark Side
|Soulja Slim
|
 You Got It
 The Darkside ft. 6 Shot
 Slippin'
 How Ya Figga
| —
|-
|1994
|Jackin' For Bounce
|Sporty aka Sporty T
|
 Frank White 
| —
|-

|1995
|True
|TRU
|
 I'm Bout' It, Bout It ft. Mia X
| —
|-
|1995
|Ghetto Stories
|Tre-8
|
 Ghetto Stories
 G Like Me (Bonus)
| —
|-
|1995
|I Wanna Be With You (single Cd)
|Mia X
|
 Broke Bitch
| —
|-
|1995
|Good Girl Gone Bad
|Mia X
|
 Ghetto Sarah Lee ft. The Conscious Daughters
 Payback II
 R.I.P., Jil
| —
|-

 

|1996
|7 Sins
| Kane & Abel
|
 Black Jesus ft. Master P
 Basement Session ft. Mia X, Skandalus, Steph
 That's How It Gon' Happen 2 U
 3/2 Murder 1
 Jealous Again ft. Mia X
| —
|-

|1996
|Hoodlum Fo' Life
|Skull Duggery
|
 Crooked Ass Cops
 The Circle
| —
|-
|1996
|Ice Cream Man
|Master P
|
 Intro
 Time To Check My Crackhouse
 Bout It Bout It II ft. Mia X
 Back Up Off Me
 Killer Pussy
|

|-

|1996
|The Saga Continues
|Sporty T
|
 I'm Alright (Radio)
 He Shot - I Shot
 Grams
 Another Hit
 He Shot - I Shot (Drama)
| —
|-

|1996
|
|Silkk The Shocker
|
 The Shocker ft. Master P
 If My 9 Could Talk
 It's On
 No Limit Party ft. Master P, Mia X
 Mr. (with Carlos Stephens)
| —
|-

|1997
|Destiny's Child
|Destiny's Child
|
 With Me Part 2 ft. Master P
|

|-

|1997
|If I Could Change - Steady Mobb'n (single cd)
|Mia X
|
 Down To Do Whatever
| —
|-
|1997
|Ghetto D
|Master P
|
 Ghetto D ft. C-Murder, Silkk The Shocker
 We Riders ft. Mac
 Come And Get Some
 Weed & Hennessey ft. C-Murder, Silkk The Shocker
 I Miss My Homies
 Make 'Em Say Uhh!
|

|-
|1997
|Ginuwine...The Bachelor
|Ginuwine
|
 When Doves Cry (Kid Kut Remix)
|

|-
|1997
|Life Insurance
|Mr. Serv-On
|
 5 Hollow Points ft. Big Ed, Fiend, Mia X, Kane & Abel
 Affiliated
 Heaven Is So Close ft. Master P, Silkk The Shocker
 Throw Ya City Up
 Time To Check My Fetty ft. Master P
 Tryin' To Make It Out Da Ghetto ft. Master P
 We Ain't The Same ft. Mo B. Dick
 Who Raised Me ft. Fiend 
 You Know I Would ft. Mia X 
|

|-
|1997
|Pre-Meditated Drama
| Steady Mobb'n
|
 It's On ft. Master P, Fiend 
 Up To No Good ft. Big Ed, Mia X, Master P
|

|-
|1997
|TRU 2 Da Game
|TRU
|
 No Limit Soldiers
 I Always Feel Like...
 There Dey Go
 I Got Candy
 What They Call Us?
 Swamp Nigga
 Eyes Of A Killa
 Heaven 4 A Gangsta (TRU Remix)
 Freak Hoes
 1nce Upon A Time
 They Can't Stop Us!
 The Lord Is Testin Me
 No Limit Soldiers (Club Mix)
|

|-
|1997
|Unlady Like
|Mia X
|
 I'll Take Yo Man '97 ft. Salt-n-Pepa, Hurby Luv Bug
 Let's Get It Straight
 R.I.P., Jil
 Thank You ft. Mo B. Dick, T.C., Mercedes
 Unlady Like
 You Don't Wanna Go 2 War ft. Master P, Silkk The Shocker, C-Murder, Mystikal 
 Mama's Family (with Craig B.) ft. Kane & Abel, Mr. Serv-On
 Rainy Dayz (with Craig B., Mo B. Dick)
|

|-
|1997
|Unpredictable
|Mystikal
|
 Ain't No Limit ft. Silkk The Shocker
 Born 2 Be a Soldier ft. Master P, Silkk The Shocker
 Gangstas ft. Master P, Snoop Dogg
 Ghetto Child ft. Master P, Silkk The Shocker
 It Yearns
 Shine
|

|-

|1998
|Am I My Brother's Keeper
|Kane & Abel
|
 Am I My Brother's Keeper
 Betta Kill Me (with Craig B)
 Bout That Combat
 Greens, Cornbread and Cabbage ft. Master P, Prime Suspects
 Let's Go Get 'Em
 Throw Them Thangs ft. Magic
 Out of Town Bs ft. Snoop Dogg
 Watch Me ft. Mystikal, Silkk The Shocker, Soulja Slim
 My Hood to Yo Hood
|

|-
|1998
|
|Big Ed
|
 Make Some Room
 Uh Oh
 Assassin
| —
|-
|1998
|Black Mafia
|Steady Mobb'n
|
 Hit A Lick ft. Prime Suspects
 Lil Niggas ft. Lil Soldiers
 Niggas Like Me ft. Mystikal, Silkk The Shocker
| —
|-
|1998
|Charge It 2 Da Game
|Silkk The Shocker
|
 I'm A Soldier ft. Master P, Fiend, C-Murder, Mac, Mystikal, Mia X, Big Ed
 Let Me Hit It ft. Mystikal
|

|-
|1998
|Da Game Is to Be Sold, Not to Be Told
|Snoop Dogg
|
 Doggz Gonna Get Ya
 Get Bout It and Rowdy ft. Master P
 Snoop World ft. Master P
 Tru Tank Dogs ft. Mystikal
 Ain't Nut'in Personal ft. C-Murder, Silkk the Shocker
|

|-
|1998
|Doin' Thangs
|Big Bear
|
 No Matter What
| —
|-
|1998
|
|Sons of Funk
|
 Make Love To A Thug
 Sons Reasons
 Got The Hook-Up!
|

|-
|1998
|Ghetto Fabulous
|Mystikal
|
 Dirty South / Dirty Jerz' ft. Naughty By Nature
 I'm On Fire
 Round Out The Tank
 Watcha Want, Watcha Need ft. Busta Rhymes
 Yaah!
|

|-
|1998
|Ghetto Organized
|Gambino Family
|
 Don't Cry ft. Gotti, Fiend, Q.B., Magic, C-Murder
 I'm a Baller ft. Master P, C-Murder, Fiend, Mia X
 Make 'Em Bleed ft. Silkk The Shocker, Fiend, Mr. Serv-On
 Only G's Ride ft. Mystikal, Mo B. Dick
 Drama in My Cityft. Ghetto Commission, KLC
|

|-
|1998
|Give It 2 'Em Raw
|Soulja Slim
|
 At The Same Time ft. Snoop Dogg
 Only Real N...
 You Got It (II)
 Wootay
 What's Up, What's Happening
 Getting Real
 Pray for Your Baby (with Mo B. Dick and Odell)
|

|-
|1998
|Guilty 'Til Proven Innocent
|Prime Suspects
|
 Ride Wit My Heat
 My Old Lady
 Tweekin'
 We Gots To Do 'Em
 Consequences Of The Streets
 Daily Routine
 Young Niggas
|

|-
|1998
|Let's Ride
|Montell Jordan
|
 Let's Ride (as Engineer for remixes)
|

|-
|1998
|Life or Death
|C-Murder
|
 Down 4 My Niggaz ft. Snoop Dogg, Magic
 Akickdoe ft. UGK, Master P
 A Second Chance
 Only the Strong Survive (with Odell) ft. Master P
 Dreams ft. KLC
 Feel My Pain
 On the Run ft. Soulja Slim, Da Hound
 Riders
 Soldiers ft. Master P, Silkk The Shocker, Fiend, Mac, Mia X, Big Ed, Kane & Abel, Mystikal
 Survival of the Fittest ft. Gotti
 Where I'm From ft. Prime Suspects
|

|-
|1998
|Mama Drama
|Mia X
|
 Bring It On ft. C-Murder, Fiend, Mac, Mystikal, Skull Duggery
 Fallen Angels (Dear Jill)
 Flip 2 Rip ft. Mac, KLC
 I Think Somebody ft. Fiend
 Mama Drama ft. Fiend, Mystikal
 Mama's Tribute
 Play Wit Pussy
 Puttin' It Down
 Thugs Like Me ft. Fiend, Kane & Abel, Mac, Mystikal
|

|-
|1998
|Memorial Day
|Full Blooded
|
 Countdown ft. Camouflage, Steady Mobb'n
 The Quickest Way To Die ft. E.X.D. (Hounds from Gert Town), Mo B. Dick
|

|-
|1998
|MP Da Last Don
|Master P
|
 Let My 9 Get Em
 Make 'Em Say Uhh #2 ft. Silkk The Shocker, Fiend, Snoop Dogg, Mia X
 More 2 Life
 The Ghetto's Got Me Trapped ft. Silkk The Shocker, Sons of Funk
 Till We Dead And Gone ft. Bone Thugs-n-Harmony
 Let's Get 'Em
| 

|-
|1998
|My Balls and My Word
|Young Bleed
|
 Keep It Real
 Bring The Noise
 How Ya Do Dat
 Times So Hard (with Odell) ft. Master P, Fiend
|

|-
|1998
|
|Mack 10
|
 Made Niggaz ft. Master P, Mystikal
|

|-
|1998
|Shell Shocked
|Mac
|
 Murda, Murda, Kill, Kill
 We Don't Love 'Em
 Wooo
 The Game
 Memories
 Meet Me At The Hotel
 Empire
 Shell Shocked (Outro)
|

|-
|1998
|Sky's The Limit
|Magic
|
 Ghetto Godzilla
 No Hope
 Take It To Da Streets
 I Never
 New Generation
 Gimpin'
 Chastity
|

|-
|1998
|There's One in Every Family
|Fiend
|
 Big Timer ft. Mia X
 Do You Know? ft. Master P, Mystikal
 Do You Wanna Be a Rider ft. Magic, Prime Suspects, Gambino Family
 For the N.O.
 Live Me Long
 Slangin' ft. UGK
 Take My Pain ft. Master P, Silkk The Shocker, Sons of Funk
 Walk Like a G ft. Soulja Slim
 We Survivors ft. Full Blooded
 What Cha Mean ft. Soulja Slim, Kane & Abel, Mac
|

|-
|1998
|These Wicked Streets
|Skull Duggery
|
 Shakin’ In The Streets ft. KLC
 It's No Limit
 If U Feel ft. C-Murder, Silkk The Shocker
|

|-
|1998
|Wise Guys
|Ghetto Commission
|
 Get 'Em Up
 Lost Thugs
|

|-

|1999
|Bossalinie
|C-Murder
|
 Freedom
 Money Talks
 Where We Wanna
|
|-
|1999
|Boot Camp
|Lil Soldiers
|
 Mama Need A New Blouse
 Chipped Out Tank
 For My Shorties
 Soulja By Blood
 Bring It 2 You
| —
|-
|1999
|Da Crime Family
|TRU
|
 Hoody Hoo
 Don't Judge Me
 Buss That
 Don't Fuck With TRU
|
|-
|1999
|Da Next Level
|Mr. Serv-On
|
 Boot 'Em Up
 My Story
 Tank Nigga
 The Last Song
|
|-

|1999
|Gangsta Harmony
|Mo B. Dick
|
 Mo B's Theme
 Got 2 Git Mine
|
|-
|1999
|90-99
|Hype Enough Records: Limited Edition EP)
|
 SouljaFaLyfe
 Made For Walkin
 Powda Bag
 Kickin It For Them Hoes
 Bitch Nigga
 You Got It
 Slippin
 Lil Bit
| —
|-

|1999
|Made Man
|Silkk The Shocker
|
 I Want To Be With You
 All Because Of You ft. Mia X
 No Limit ft. Fiend
 Mr.'99
 This Is 4 My ft. Fiend
 Get It Up (with Craig B., Odell) ft. Snoop Dogg
|
|-
|1999
|No Limit Top Dogg
|Snoop Dogg
|
 Down for My N's ft. C-Murder, Magic
 Ghetto Symphony ft. Mia X, Fiend, C-Murder, Silkk The Shocker, Mystikal, Goldie Loc
|

|-
|1999
|On Top of da World
|Lil Italy
|
 Hoez and Tramps ft. Fiend
 We Ain't Hard to Find ft. Snoop Dogg, Mystikal
|
|-
|1999
|Street Life
|Fiend
|
 Been Thru It All ft. Magic
 If They Don't Know
 Mr. Whomp Whomp
 Talk It How I Bring It
 The Rock Show
 They Don't Hear Me
 Trip To London ft. Mo B. Dick, Kage, Odell
 Waiting On God
 Walk That Line
 War 4 Reason
|

|-

|1999
|The Message
|Eddie Griffin
|
This is For The Riders  ft. Master P, Silkk the Shocker, Fiend, (with Mo B. Dick)
| —
|-

|2000
|Let's Get Ready
|Mystikal
|
 Ready to Rumble (with Craig B., Odell, Mo B. Dick)
 Big Truck Boys
 Murder III
|

|-
|2000
|War Is Me, Pt. 1: Battle Decisions
|Mr. Serv-On
|
 What They Do ft. Fiend, Three 6 Mafia
 Whatcha Want ft. KLC
| —
|-
|-
|2000
|Ghetto Platinum
|5th Ward Weebie
|
 Show Dat Work
 Club Hoppers P Poppers
 Word
 Whatever
| —
|-
|-
|2000
|3rd Ward Stepper The Album
|Skull Duggery
|
 The Grudge 
| —
|-

|2001
|
|6 Shot
|
 Itz Ya Dog
 Ruthless Renegade
| —
|-

|2001
|
|E-Dub
|
 Bad Az I Wanna Be ft. Mr. Serv-On, 6 Shot, Fiend, Skull Duggery
| —
|-

|2001
|Tarantula
|Mystikal
|
 Big Truck Driver
 Pussy Crook
 Paper Stack ft. Dart, Beezy Boy, Shonnie
 That's That Shit
 The Return
|
|-
|2001
|Untamed
|Full Blooded & H.O.U.N.D. Faculty
|
 What It Be Like
| —
|-

|2001
|Word of Mouf
|Ludacris
|
 Move Bitch ft. Mystikal, I-20
|
|-

|2002
|Ready for Combat
|Big Slack
|
 Cock Strong Guerrillas
| —
|-
|2002
|This Is Real
|Hard Knox
|
 It's Like That
 This Is Real
 Put 'Um Up
| —
|-

|2003
|Diplomatic Immunity (album)
|The Diplomats
|
 Bout It Bout It Part III   ft. Master P
| —
|-
|2003
|Juve The Great
|Juvenile
|
 For Everybody ft. Skip, Wacko
|
|-

|2003
|Win, Lose or Draw
|Don Yute
|
 Blim Blam (with Craig B) ft. Raquel Akua
| —
|-
|2003
|Mississippi: The Album
|David Banner
|
 What It Do ft. Smoke D
| —
|-
|2003
|Raw & Uncut
|Turk
|
 Amped Up
|
|-

|2003
|Where’s My Money
|Young Hustlaz
|
| —
|-
|2003
|Years Later...A Few Months After
|Soulja Slim
|
 U Hear Dat
 Souljas On My Feet
| —
|-
|2003
|Reality Check 
|Young A
|
Come Serve Me ft. Soulja Slim, B.G.
Come Serve Me (remix) ft. Soulja Slim, Mia X
| —
|-

|2004
|Game Over
|Ke'Noe
|
 Big Thangs ft. B.G.
| —
|-
|2004
|Life After Cash Money
|B.G.
|
 Do What You Wanna Do ft. 6 Shot, Big Gipp
 Don't Talk To Me
| —
|-

|2004
|Urban Legend
|T.I.
|
 What They Do ft. B.G.
|
|-

|2005
|Club Bangaz
|Partners-N-Crime
|
 Club Bangaz ft. Juvenile
| —
|-
|2005
|Glamorest Life
|Trina
|
 Shake Wit It (with Fiend) ft. Lil Scrappy
| —
|-
|2005
|
|B.G.
|
 Get Up
| —
|-
|2005
|
|Paul Wall
|
 Internet Going Nutz
|
|-
|2005
|Trill
|Bun B
|
 Bun
|
|-
|2006
|
|C-Murder
|
 My Life
|
|-

|2006
|
|Fiend
|
 Want It All
 Gotta Get It
 What Is U Sayin
| —
|-

|2006
|My Block: Miami The Mixtape
|DJ EFN
|
| —
|-

|2006
|My Homies Part 2
|Scarface
|
 Club Bangaz ft. Partners-N-Crime
| —
|-

|2006
|
|C-Murder
|
| —
|-

|2007
|Get Money, Stay True
|Paul Wall
|
 I'm Real, What Are You?
| —
|-

|2008
|Life Insurance 2: Heartmuzik
|Mr. Serv-On
|
 Hood Made Me ft. Calicoe, KLC
| —
|-

|2009
|Thug Brothers
|Soulja Slim & B.G.
|
 Runnin'
| —
|-
|2009
|Stay Ready
|Lil Dee
|
 Stay Ready
 Naw Takin Bout
 How I Got Here
| —
|-
|2009
|Too Hood 2 Be Hollywood
|B.G.
|
 Nigga Owe Me Some Money ft. Soulja Slim, Lil Boosie, C-Murder
 Hit The Block & Roll
| —
|-

|2010
|Grand Theft Audio: The Mixtape
|Calicoe the Champ, Mystikal, Mia X, Fiend, Mr. Serv-On
|
| —
|-
|2010
|I'ont Like You (Single)
|Mystikal ft. Fiend
|
| —
|-
|2010
|Dat's Money (Single)
|Fetti  ft. T-Bo
|
| —
|-

|2011
|That Woman (Single)
|Mystikal
|
| —
|-

|2012
|Grand Larceny
|Calicoe the Champ
|
| —
|-
|2012
|Bullshit (Single)
|Mystikal
|
| —
|-

|2012
|Forgiven
|Rubis
|
 Fatal Attraction
| —
|-

|2012
|Reloaded
|Slim Reaper
|
 Go Off
 Above the Law
 Ignant
| —
|-

|2012
|1993 Lp
|Flow Jonez
|
 One Two
| —
|-

|2012
|Code Red (Single) 
|Red Sonya
|
Code Red
| —
|-

|2012
|The Wrath
| Amaze-njznicest, Snoop Dogg
|
 Wow
| —
|-

|2013
|Hit Me (Single)
|Mystikal
|
| —
|-

|2013
|Lundi Gras
|Fat 2s Day
|
 Always
 Better Late Then Never
| —
|-

|2013
|Dedicated 2 The Greatest  (Single)
|Mo B. Dick
|
| —
|-

|2013
|Priest Andretti
|Curren$y
|
 Trip To London  ft. Fiend
| —
|-

|2013
|$1000 (Single)
|KLC
|
| —
|-

|2013
|Psalms of David II
|Dee-1
|
 Psalms of David II Intro (ft. Alainia)
| —
|-

|2015
|Duffy (Single)
|Paco Troxclair 
| 
| —
|-

|2015
| Canal Street Confidential
| Curren$y
| 
 Str8  ft.Corner Boy P & Fiend
| —
|-

|2019
| Mind Right (Single)
|BIG Marv AKA Splitt
| 
| —
|-|

|2021
| The Drummajor Pt.1 KLC
| KLC
| —
|-|
|}

"—" denotes a release that did not chart

Compilation Albums and Movie SoundtracksBlade Movie Soundtrack (1998) - Edge of the Blade (Mystikal)
 RIAA certification: Gold
 Billboard 200 - #36
 Billboard R&B/Hip-Hop - #28Chef Aid: The South Park Album (1998) - Kenny's Dead (Master P)
 ARIA (Australia) - #1
 UK - #3Down South Hustlers: Bouncin' and Swingin' (1995)
 RIAA certification: Gold
 You Got It (Soulja Slim)
 RIP (CCG)  (with Mo B. Dick)
 Murder Weapon (E.X.D./Hounds from Gert Town)Foolish – Movie Soundtrack (1999)
 RIAA certification: Gold
 Billboard 200 - #32
 Top R&B/Hip-Hop Albums - #10
 They Don't Hear Me (Fiend)
 Yes Indeed (Kane & Abel)How to Be a Player Movie Soundtrack (1997) - How to Be a Playa (Master P, Fiend, Silkk the Shocker)
 RIAA certification: Gold
 Billboard 200 - #7
 Billboard R&B/Hip-Hop - #2I Got The Hook Up! Movie Soundtrack (1998)
 RIAA certification: Platinum
 Billboard 200 - #3
 Billboard R&B/Hip-Hop - #1
 Hook It Up (Master P, Bone Thugs-n-Harmony)
 Shake Something (Mystikal, Mia X, KLC)
 Itch Or Scratch (Fiend, Mac, Prime Suspects)
 We Got It (Mr. Serv-On, Big Ed, Magic, Fiend)
 I Got The Hook-Up! (Master P, Sons of Funk)
 RIAA Certified Gold Single (I Got The Hook Up)
 Billboard Hot 100 - #16
 Hot R&B/Hip-Hop Singles & Tracks - #11I'm Bout It Movie Soundtrack (1997)
 RIAA certification: Gold
 Billboard 200 - #4
 Billboard R&B/HipHop - #1
 What Cha Think (Mystikal)
 How Ya Do Dat  (Young Bleed)
 Don't Mess Around (Fiend)
 For Realz (Kane & Abel)
 Cops Runnin' After Ya (Prime Suspects)Mean Green: Major Players Compilation (1998)
 RIAA certification: Gold
 Billboard 200 - #9
 Top R&B/Hip-Hop Albums - #6
 Mean Green (Intro)
 We... (Fiend, Mac)
 The Mirror Don't Lie (2 For 1)Rhyme & Reason Movie Soundtrack (1997) - Is There a Heaven 4 a Gangsta? (Master P)
 RIAA certification: Gold
 Billboard 200 - #16
 R&B/HipHop - #1Southwest Riders (1997) - Get Cha Mind Right (Mystikal)
 Billboard 200 - #23
 R&B/HipHop - #2The Substitute Movie Soundtrack (1996) - Bang'Em Up (TRU, Mr. Serv-On)We Can't Be Stopped (1998)
 No Limit Soldiers II (No Limit Soldiers)
 Girl Power (Mia X)
 Break Something (Fiend)
 Assassin (Big Ed)West Coast Bad Boyz II (1997) - R.I.P. Tupac (Master P)
 Billboard 200 - #8
 R&B/HipHop - #2Who U Wit? Compilation''' (1999)
 Billboard 200 - #62
 R&B/HipHop - #22
 Cold Wit It (Fiend)
 You Ain't A Baller (Magic)
 Smash and Ball (Mr. Serv-On) (with Craig B., Odell, Mo B. Dick)
 Pass the Ball (2 for 1) (with Craig B., Odell, Mo B. Dick)

KLC tracks in pop culture
 Move Bitch was used in the movie ATL and the clean version was used in the movie Hancock.
 Move Bitch was referenced in the Smack Her With A Dick (Rap Stand Up) skit in Chris Rock's stand-up comedy movie Never Scared.
 In a scene of the movie, Bad Boys II, actor Will Smith quoted lyrics from Move Bitch.
 Down 4 My Niggaz was played in the movie Street Kings.
 At the 2010–2011 season opener, The Miami Heat entered the American Airlines Arena to a break instrumental of Down 4 My Niggaz and frequently use this song for home games.
 The lyrics of Down 4 My Niggaz were referenced in the book The Year Before the Flood: A Story of New Orleans by Ned Sublette.
 Get Back by Ludacris was used in Tropic Thunder

Sampling and interpolation
The following is a list of songs that KLC sampled in some of his tracks as well as songs that sampled or interpolated tracks produced by KLC.
 3/2 Murder 1 sampled How High by Method Man & Redman
 He Shot I Shot samples Eazy Duz It by Eazy-E
 Down 4 My Niggaz:
 Green Goblin by Jae Millz (ft. Chris Brown) contains an interpolation from Down 4 My Niggaz was sampled in If U Were The Girl by Monica
 was interpolated in Tammy's Song (Her Evils) by Kendrick Lamar
 "Blood on the Leaves" by Kanye West contains an interpolation from Down 4 My Niggaz Ghetto D sampled Eric B. Is President by Eric B. & Rakim
 Ghetto Symphony sampled The Symphony by Marley Marl which sampled Hard to Handle by Otis Redding
 I Got Candy sampled Candy (Cameo song) by Cameo
 I'll Take Ya Man sampled:
 Flash Light by Parliament (band)
 Rock The Bells by LL Cool J
 Dear Yvette by LL Cool J
 I'm Bout It Bout It was interpolated in Bout It 11 by Curren$y
 Internet Going Nutz sampled Still Tippin by Mike Jones
 Kenny's Dead sampled Freddie's Dead by Curtis Mayfield
 Make 'Em Say Uhh!:
 sampled Apache by Sugarhill Gang
 contains an interpolation of the refrain from The Funk Box Party by Masterdon Committee
 was sampled in The Right Stuff by Girl Talk
 was interpolated in Be Easy by Wiz Khalifa
 Move Bitch was sampled in:
 5th of Remy by AJ McGhee
 Bodies Hit the Floor by Girl Talk
 Hoy Me Levanté by Maicol & Manuel
 Let's Run This by Girl Talk
 Aus'm Weg by Sido (rapper)
 Oh No by Girl Talk
 Move Bitch was interpolated in:
 Random by Lady Sovereign
 Reckless Driving by J Dilla
 Soldier by DMX
 Rick Ross included an interpolation of No Limit Soldiers in his song 300 Soldiers

"The Drum major Pt.1" album
Finally KLC's much-anticipated solo project, (The Medicine Men Present) The Drum major Pt.1, was released on March 5, 2021, under label Overdose Empire. Track listing'''
1. The Drumamjor 
2. I'ont Hide 
3. Play It Loud  
4. Holla At Me  
5. Bang Boogie  
6. Break Bread 
7. Deep Up Off 
8. Soulja Like Me 
9. I Got You 
10. Hold It Down 
11. Where Them Hoes At 
12. Do What I Gotta Do 
13. In A Minute 
14. No Place Like Home 
15. Loyalty  
16. Duffy

Other released tracks
The following is a list of tracks from KLC's BMI repertoire that have not been affiliated with an album release.

See also
 KLC
 Mo B. Dick
 The Medicine Men
 No Limit Records discography
 Sampling

External links
 BMI Repertoire - Craig S. Lawson
 KLC credits on AllMusic.com
 KLC on Discog.com
 KLC on AlbumCredits.com
 Music by KLC sampled by others
 Music sampled by KLC

References

Discographies of American artists
Hip hop discographies
Production discographies